Orthocentrus is a genus of ichneumon wasps in the family Ichneumonidae. There are at least 90 described species in Orthocentrus.

Species
These 90 species belong to the genus Orthocentrus:

 Orthocentrus albihumerus Broad g
 Orthocentrus alboscutellum Broad g
 Orthocentrus ambiguus Holmgren, 1858 c g
 Orthocentrus anguillae Broad g
 Orthocentrus anomalus Gravenhorst, 1829 c g
 Orthocentrus asper (Gravenhorst, 1829) c g
 Orthocentrus attenuatus Holmgren, 1858 c g
 Orthocentrus bicoloratus Veijalainen g
 Orthocentrus bilineator Aubert, 1959 c g
 Orthocentrus brevipilus Broad g
 Orthocentrus broadi Veijalainen g
 Orthocentrus canariensis Hellen, 1949 c g
 Orthocentrus castellanus Ceballos, 1963 c g
 Orthocentrus compressicoxis Benoit, 1954 c g
 Orthocentrus concrispus Veijalainen g
 Orthocentrus corrugatus Holmgren, 1858 c g
 Orthocentrus daucus Gauld, 1984 c g
 Orthocentrus decoratus Townes, 1945 c g
 Orthocentrus defossus Brues, 1910 c g
 Orthocentrus deletus Morley, 1912 c
 Orthocentrus elongaticornis (Benoit, 1954) c g
 Orthocentrus excalibur Gauld, 1984 c g
 Orthocentrus exiguus Cresson, 1865 g
 Orthocentrus facialis Brischke, 1878 c g
 Orthocentrus flavifrons Veijalainen g
 Orthocentrus frontator (Zetterstedt, 1838) c g
 Orthocentrus fulvipes Gravenhorst, 1829 c g
 Orthocentrus harlequinus Veijalainen g
 Orthocentrus hirsutor Aubert, 1969 c g
 Orthocentrus hirtus Benoit, 1955 c g
 Orthocentrus hispidus Veijalainen g
 Orthocentrus immundus Seyrig, 1934 c g
 Orthocentrus indistinctus Benoit, 1954 c g
 Orthocentrus insularis Ashmead, 1894 c
 Orthocentrus intermedius Förster, 1850 c g
 Orthocentrus lativalvis Benoit, 1954 c g
 Orthocentrus limpidus Seyrig, 1935 c g
 Orthocentrus lineatus Brischke, 1871 c g
 Orthocentrus longiceps Seyrig, 1935 c g
 Orthocentrus longicornis Holmgren, 1858 c g
 Orthocentrus lucens Provancher, 1879 c
 Orthocentrus luteoclypeus Veijalainen g
 Orthocentrus macrocerus Strobl, 1903 c g
 Orthocentrus maculae Veijalainen g
 Orthocentrus marginatus Holmgren, 1858 c g
 Orthocentrus mediocris Seyrig, 1934 c g
 Orthocentrus mishana Veijalainen g
 Orthocentrus monilicornis Holmgren, 1858 c g
 Orthocentrus neglectus Förster, 1850 c g
 Orthocentrus nicaraguensis Veijalainen g
 Orthocentrus nigricornis Boheman, 1866 c g
 Orthocentrus nigristernus Rondani, 1877 c g
 Orthocentrus onkonegare Broad g
 Orthocentrus orbitator Aubert, 1963 c g
 Orthocentrus pallidifrons (Morley, 1913) c g
 Orthocentrus pallidus Veijalainen g
 Orthocentrus palpalis Brischke, 1892 c g
 Orthocentrus patulus Holmgren, 1858 c g
 Orthocentrus pentagonum Broad g
 Orthocentrus petiolaris Thomson, 1897 c g
 Orthocentrus primus Brues, 1906 c g
 Orthocentrus protervus Holmgren, 1858 c g
 Orthocentrus pulcher Seyrig, 1934 c g
 Orthocentrus punctatissimus Benoit, 1954 c g
 Orthocentrus quercus Veijalainen g
 Orthocentrus radialis Thomson, 1897 c g
 Orthocentrus rectus Veijalainen g
 Orthocentrus rovensis Seyrig, 1934 c g
 Orthocentrus rufescens Brischke, 1871 c g
 Orthocentrus rufipes Brischke, 1871 c g
 Orthocentrus rugulosus (Provancher, 1883) c g
 Orthocentrus saaksjarvii Veijalainen g
 Orthocentrus sannio Holmgren, 1858 c g
 Orthocentrus scurra Veijalainen g
 Orthocentrus semiflavus Seyrig, 1935 c g
 Orthocentrus shieldsi Broad g
 Orthocentrus spurius Gravenhorst, 1829 c g
 Orthocentrus strigatus Holmgren, 1858 c g
 Orthocentrus tenuiflagellum Veijalainen g
 Orthocentrus testaceipes Brischke, 1878 c
 Orthocentrus tetrazonatus (Ashmead, 1896) c g
 Orthocentrus thomsoni Roman, 1936 c g
 Orthocentrus trichomma Gauld, 1984 c g
 Orthocentrus trifasciatus Walsh, 1873 c g
 Orthocentrus tuberculatus Brischke, 1891 c g
 Orthocentrus umbrocciput Veijalainen g
 Orthocentrus urbanus Seyrig, 1934 c g
 Orthocentrus wahlbergi Veijalainen g
 Orthocentrus winnertzii Förster, 1850 c
 Orthocentrus zebra Veijalainen g

Data sources: i = ITIS, c = Catalogue of Life, g = GBIF, b = Bugguide.net

References

Further reading

External links

 

Parasitic wasps